Taoudénit (Bambara: ߕߊߎߘߋߣߌ ߘߌߣߋߖߊ tr. Taudeni Dineja) is a region of Mali legislatively created in 2012 from the northern part of Timbuktu Cercle in Tombouctou Region. Actual implementation of the region began on 19 January 2016 with the appointment of Abdoulaye Alkadi as the region's governor. Members of the region's transitional council were appointed on 14 October 2016. General Abderrahmane Ould Meydou replaced Alkadi as governor in July 2017.

The region is divided into six cercles: Achouratt, Al-Ourche, Araouane, Boudje-Béha, Foum-Alba and Taoudénit. The capital will be located at Taoudénit, although the government is currently based in Timbuktu owing to the lack of infrastructure in Taoudénit.

References

 
Regions of Mali
States and territories established in 2016
2016 establishments in Mali